A scroll plain occurs where a river meanders across an area with a very low gradient, usually with a fairly continuous discharge. In addition to meanders, scroll plains are also characterised by many oxbow lakes.

See also
Strath

References

Geography articles needing expert attention
Plains
Topography